The 1987 Hamburg state election was held on 17 May 1987 to elect members of the 13th Hamburg Parliament. It was the first time in nine years that the FDP has held a seat in the parliament, which resulted in a social-liberal coalition.

Election Result 

|-
| align=center colspan=8| 
|-
! colspan="2" | Party
! Votes
! %
! +/-pp
! Seats 
! +/-
! Seats %
|-
| bgcolor=| 
| align=left | Social Democratic Party (SPD)
| align=right| 442,670
| align=right| 45
| align=right| 3.3
| align=right| 55
| align=right| 2
| align=right| 45.8
|-
| bgcolor=| 
| align=left | Christian Democratic Union (CDU)
| align=right| 398,686
| align=right| 40.5
| align=right| 1.4
| align=right| 49
| align=right| 5
| align=right| 40.8
|-
| bgcolor=| 
| align=left | Alliance 90/The Greens (Grüne)
| align=right| 69,148
| align=right| 7
| align=right| 3.4
| align=right| 8
| align=right| 5
| align=right| 6.7
|-
| bgcolor=| 
| align=left | Free Democratic Party (FDP)
| align=right| 64,389
| align=right| 6.5
| align=right| 1.7
| align=right| 8
| align=right| 8
| align=right| 6.7
|-
|}

References 

Elections in Hamburg
1987 elections in Germany
1980s in Hamburg
May 1987 events in Europe